The Washington Conservation Corps (WCC) is a subagency of the Washington State Department of Ecology. WCC creates future leaders through community involvement and leadership. WCC members restore critical habitat, build 
trails, and respond to disasters. WCC completes environmental service across the state of Washington. In addition, WCC is part of a state and nationwide disaster response network.

Positions
Corps members (18-25 years olds and military veterans) serve between a 3-month and a 11.5 month term. Most have the opportunity to enroll for a second term, and many do.  Returning members often serve as Assistant Supervisors or Individual Placements (referred to as IP) during their second term.

WCC members can serve on a crew. Crews are based in a locality and serve in that locality. Crew members can find themselves in a variety of settings helping with riparian zone restoration work, wetland restoration work, invasive species clearing, and other environmental enhancement projects.  Each project can last several days, and is referred to sometimes as a "spike". Crews have several "spikes" during their term. Each crew is led by a crew supervisor, a Washington State Department of Ecology employee.

Alternatively, a corps member may elect to serve as an individual placement (IP). IPs serve as interns with one agency for their entire term.  IPs generally serve as environmental educators, outreach coordinators, biological technicians or lab technicians.

Benefits
WCC AmeriCorps members earn a living stipend that is similar to minimum wage, since their term is seen as service to Washington specifically and the US in general. WCC provides health insurance and the opportunity to gain nationally recognized certifications (e.g. Red Card, Wilderness First Responder, Hazwoper), through paid training. Additionally, WCC AmeriCorps members have qualified student loans put on forbearance and receive an educational award from AmeriCorps (2020 rate: $6195) at the end of their term.

External links
 

AmeriCorps organizations
Nature conservation organizations based in the United States
Environment of Washington (state)
Environmental organizations based in Washington (state)
Service year programs in the United States